Narcotic dermopathy is a skin condition caused by the injection of drugs intravenously, resulting in thrombosed, cordlike, thickened veins at the site of injection.

See also 
 Skin lesion

References 

Skin conditions resulting from physical factors